The 2022 All-Ireland Senior Football Championship Final was the 135th final of the All-Ireland Senior Football Championship in Gaelic football, the culmination of the 2022 All-Ireland Senior Football Championship. The match was played at Croke Park in Dublin on 24 July 2022. This was the earliest in the year that the final has ever taken place.

Munster champions Kerry took on Connacht champions Galway. It was the eighth time the teams had met in the final; Galway won the first encounter in a final replay in 1938.

Kerry won the final by a margin of four points, on a scoreline of 0–20 to 0–16 to claim their 38th title.

The final was played before a capacity attendance of 82,300 people. An average of 862,000 people watched the game, with a peak figure of 1.09 million as the match reached its climax. The game received a 75% audience share.

The game was televised nationally on RTÉ2 as part of The Sunday Game live programme, presented by Joanne Cantwell from the Croke Park studio, with analysis from Ciarán Whelan, Seán Cavanagh and Pat Spillane. Match commentary was provided by Darragh Maloney, assisted by Kevin McStay. This was Spillane's last appearance as a pundit on The Sunday Game after three decades, having decided to retire at the end of the 2022 GAA season. The game was also televised internationally by Sky Sports.

Background
Kerry entered the game as the most successful Gaelic football team in the history of the competition, having previously won 37 since the competition's inception in 1887. They were aiming to win their first All-Ireland since 2014 and an unprecedented 38th All-Ireland title. Galway were the third most successful team, having won nine.

Galway's qualification for the final was the first time since 2010 that a team other than Donegal, Dublin, Mayo or Tyrone made the final.

It was Galway's first All-Ireland final since winning in 2001. Galway aimed to win a tenth All-Ireland; this would make them only the third county to reach double figures in the all-time rankings.

The two counties have met in the final on seven previous occasions, with Galway winning three of these (1938, 1964, 1965) and Kerry winning four (1940, 1941, 1959, 2000).

Kerry were priced at odds of 1/3 to win the match, with Galway at 10/3 and the draw at 8/1. Pundits from outside the counties involved, such as Colm O'Rourke, tipped Kerry to win.

Paths to the final

Galway

Kerry

Pre-match
Galway International Arts Festival and Galway City Council arranged to screen the final in a large tent in Galway, with tickets being free of charge.

Demand for tickets for the final was extremely high. Kerry made tickets available for a post-match party at a Dublin nightclub. The scramble for coaches and trains was also unmatched. A special extra Iarnród Éireann train for the final was sold out in minutes, reflecting the huge demand for train transport to and from the game.

The Athlone Railway Bridge was lit up in maroon and white colours in a show of support for the Galway footballers.

On 13 July, Tyrone's Sean Hurson was named as referee for the final, his first All-Ireland SFC final.

Immediately prior to the match, the Kerry team that won the 1997 All-Ireland Final, along with the Dublin and Meath teams that won the 1995 and 1996 All-Ireland Finals were presented to the crowd.

Match

Summary
Prior to the game, Kerry were the favourites to win. Galway had the first score of the encounter, a '45 by Shane Walsh in the 5th minute. Three minutes later, Galway had the first goal chance of the day but Johnny Heaney's effort was partially blocked by Kerry's Stephen O'Brien, and the ball went over the bar. Kerry's opening point arrived a minute later, David Clifford putting over after calling for the mark in front of goals.

Kerry were surprisingly poor in the first half. Often stripped of possession when they took the ball into the tackle, facing a heavily-manned Galway defence, they were unable to create any goal chances or much in the way of flowing moves. Galway, as the underdogs, played dominantly throughout the opening 35 minutes, scoring seven points to take a one-point lead in at half-time, 0–8 to 0–7, resulting in a rousing rendition of "The Fields of Athenry" ringing out around Croke Park. Shooting into the Hill goal, Galway continued to be far more economical in attack. At six apiece, corner-back Jack Glynn side-stepped a tackle, darted into traffic, somehow extricated himself before clipping over a point.

By half-time, the wide tally read 7-1 to Kerry and the consensus was they were labouring under the pressure of local expectancy. However, after the second half began, the game took on a different complexion when Kerry stepped up their game. The third quarter featured some outstanding passages of play. The teams were level four times in the opening ten minutes of the second half before Kieran Molloy and Shane Walsh sent Galway two clear. Yet Kerry found a way to gain a stronger grip on the exchanges.

On 67 minutes, with pressure ratcheting up on Kerry, Damien Comer, largely blunted as an attacking force, won a turnover near the Cusack Stand, was shunted to the deck and denied a free. He managed to feed the ball out to John Daly who then went to round the tackle of Spillane. As the players grappled, Tyrone referee Sean Hurson immediately whistled for a Kerry free, signalling that Daly had grabbed Spillane's arm in contact. The Galway players raged at the call, Daly appealing in vain to the linesman for moral support. Amid a sustained volley of boos – aimed at the referee Hurson, his first All-Ireland SFC final, rather than the kicker – David Clifford curled over the lead score from a very tight angle.

Kerry, who weathered a shaky opening 35 minutes to come strong in the final quarter, late points from David Clifford, Killian Spillane, Gavin White and Seán O'Shea with five minutes remaining saw the team win the game by four points, to claim their 38th title. Above all, it was a game adorned by majestic displays from the both teams' most gifted forwards, Shane Walsh and David Clifford. Walsh and Clifford scored 0-09 and 0-08 respectively, with Clifford having a 100% shooting record in the second-half. Winning the final quarter by six points was reflective of their control to land the prize this group had long desired.

Details

Post-match
Kerry captains Seán O'Shea and Joe O'Connor accepted the Sam Maguire Cup from GAA president Larry McCarthy in the Hogan Stand. In his post-match speech, O'Shea thanked the Kerry panel, selectors, and back room team for their work throughout the year and declared that Paddy Tally was now an "honourary Kerry man" after his coaching impact in the 2022 season.

Reaction
Kerry captain Seán O'Shea spoke to RTÉ after the match about leading Kerry to an All-Ireland and particularly given there was a "barren" period for the county. Speaking to RTÉ Sport, O'Shea said: "To finally get over the line is like a weight lifted off your shoulders".

Man of the match David Clifford speaking to RTÉ after the match said lifting the Sam Maguire Cup was "something I dreamt of all my life". He said: "It's very hard to put into words. I was always confident we'd get over the line even though over the last few years it didn't work out for us".

Kerry manager Jack O'Connor speaking after the match said that he "enjoyed the year" in working with the squad. Speaking to RTÉ Sport, O'Connor said: "We had great fun, great craic. I'm a bit long in the tooth to be feeling pressure."

Galway manager Pádraic Joyce spoke to RTÉ after the match and paid tribute to his squad and their efforts. Speaking to RTÉ Sport, Joyce said: "We were in control in the game for a long time. I think overall people were very good, we worked the first-half really well and got our match-ups set-up." However, he said he couldn't hide his annoyance over a free awarded against John Daly in the closing stages, saying he "couldn't get over it."

Outgoing RTÉ pundit Pat Spillane, who watched his two nephews Killian and Adrian Spillane win their first All-Ireland medals, remembered his late father Tom, who he said on television afterwards "would have been a proud man to now have 21 All-Ireland medals into his house". He told The Sunday Game Live: "In 1964, my father was a selector on the Kerry team against Galway. The night before the game he had a pain in his chest. He wouldn't go to the doctor and went to the game the following day as a selector. He was dead by Tuesday. Kerry-Galway matches to me always bring back this memory. He would have been a proud man to have 21 All-Ireland medals into his house. It's just a special day."

Highlights of the final were shown on The Sunday Game programme which aired at 9:30pm that night on RTÉ2 and was presented by Des Cahill with match analysis from Colm Cooper, Colm O'Rourke, Rory Gallagher, Éamonn Fitzmaurice, Noelle Healy and Oisín McConville.

Awards
David Clifford won the man of the match award which was presented by GAA president Larry McCarthy at the Kerry team's celebration banquet in Dublin. He also won The Sunday Game Footballer of the Year award. The Sunday Game panel also picked their 2022 Team of the Year on the Sunday night programme, with seven members of the Kerry team and four members of the Galway team included.

Galway's Shane Walsh was voted Footballer of the Week on the GAA.ie website on 27 July, three days after the final.

Celebrations
The Kerry team made their way on an open deck bus from Boherbee to a "Welcome Home" reception in Denny Street at around 6:30pm. Celebrations commenced in Tralee with live music on the Denny Street platform at 4:15pm, where crowds lined the streets of the town to a reception at the Ashe Memorial Hall. Among the attendees was the Minister for Education, Norma Foley. They then travelled to the Fitzgerald Stadium at 8pm where more than 10,000 people attended, and then to the Gleneagle Hotel in Killarney where further celebrations took place at 9pm. Speaking in Tralee, joint-captain Seán O'Shea said: "To be here today and see this crowd is unbelievable." He paid tribute to Galway, and said there was great respect between the two counties.

Meanwhile, the Galway team, as runners-up, also had a homecoming celebration the day after the final to honour both the senior team and the minor team who won the All-Ireland Minor Football Championship. Both teams visited Tuam Stadium and Pearse Stadium between 4pm and 7pm respectively, while the senior footballers also came to the Fair Green in Ballinasloe beforehand en route to Tuam.

References

Final
1
All-Ireland Senior Football Championship Finals
Galway county football team matches
Kerry county football team matches
All-Ireland Senior Football